Ralph E. Winters (June 17, 1909 – February 26, 2004) was a Canadian-born film editor who became one of the leading figures of this field in the American industry.

After beginning on a series of B movies in the early 1940s, including several in the Dr. Kildare series, his first major film was George Cukor's Victorian chiller Gaslight (1944).

Winters won the Academy Award for Best Film Editing for King Solomon's Mines (1950) (shared with Conrad A. Nervig) and Ben-Hur (1959) (shared with John D. Dunning). He received four additional nominations: Quo Vadis (1951), Seven Brides for Seven Brothers (1954), The Great Race (1965) and Kotch (1971). Winters' other films included On the Town (1949), High Society (1956), Jailhouse Rock (1957) and The Thomas Crown Affair (1968).

Winters had a notable collaboration with director Blake Edwards. Over 20 years, they collaborated on 12 films together, including The Pink Panther (1963), The Party (1968), 10 (1979) and Victor/Victoria (1982). His last film was the pirate epic Cutthroat Island in 1995.

Winters had been elected to membership in the American Cinema Editors, and in 1991, Winters received the organization's career achievement award. His memoir, Some Cutting Remarks: Seventy Years a Film Editor, was published in 2001.

See also
List of film director and editor collaborations

References

External links

1909 births
2004 deaths
American Cinema Editors
American film editors
Best Film Editing Academy Award winners
Canadian film editors
Canadian emigrants to the United States